Bangkalan is a town on the western coast of Madura Island in Indonesia, the government seat of the Bangkalan Regency.

Tourism
Mount Jaddih is 10 kilometres from Bangkalan and can be accessed by a motorcycle to the mountain top to see Bangkalan town and Suramadu Bridge. The 500-hectare limestone hill of Mount Jaddih also offers a spring-water swimming pool for free. Other objects of interest to tourists near Bangkalan are a lighthouse from the Dutch colonial era (15 kilometers), Rongkang Beach (20 kilometers), and the religious site of Mount Geger (60 kilometers).

Suramadu Bridge to Java
The Suramadu Bridge (Indonesian: Jembatan Suramadu), also known as the Surabaya–Madura Bridge, connects Bangkalan town on Madura to the mainland of Java.

Climate
Bangkalan has a tropical monsoon climate (Am) with moderate to little rainfall from June to October and heavy rainfall from November to May.

References

Districts of East Java
Madura Island
Regency seats of East Java